Milad Omranloo   (Persian: میلاد عمرانلو) is an Iranian conductor. 
He led the Tehran Vocal Ensemble to a gold medal at the 2009 World Choir Championship.

He has graduated in Composing from Art University and successfully completed his education on master's degree.

References

External links
Tehran Vocal Ensemble

Living people
1977 births
Iranian conductors (music)
Iranian composers
21st-century conductors (music)